Sally Chen (born 1948) is a Taiwanese actress. She has been nicknamed the "Empress specialist", having portrayed over a dozen Chinese empresses in television series.

She won Best Supporting Actress at the 1971 Golden Horse Awards. Between 1977 and 1981, she won Most Favorite Actress at the Golden Bell Awards for five consecutive years.

Filmography

Television

Film

See also
 Dai Chunrong (born 1961), another actress specializing in Chinese empresses

References

External links

Taiwanese film actresses
Taiwanese television actresses
20th-century Taiwanese actresses
21st-century Taiwanese actresses
1948 births
Living people
Actresses from Qingdao
Taiwanese people from Shandong
Chinese film actresses
Chinese television actresses
20th-century Chinese actresses
21st-century Chinese actresses